Frognerseteren is the end station of the Holmenkollen Line of the Oslo Metro, located in the Marka section of Oslo, the capital city of Norway. It the northernmost station in Oslo Metro, and is the station after Voksenkollen. The line to Frognerseteren was completed on 16 May 1916. The station has two platforms which, like other stations on the Holmenkollen Line, only accommodate two-car trains. The elevation difference between this station and the lowest in Oslo Metro (Stortinget), is the highest elevation difference within a metro network in the world.

The area around Frognerseteren has very little population, but is popular for recreation, with a restaurant and hiking trails or, during the winter, skiing. Tryvannstårnet is also within walking distance although Voksenkollen station is slightly closer.

The name
Originally this place was the seter (mountain dairy farm) of Frogner Manor.

References

External links

Oslo Metro stations in Oslo
Railway stations opened in 1916
1916 establishments in Norway